Tomas Robert Lindahl FRS FMedSci (born 28 January 1938) is a Swedish-British scientist specialising in cancer research. In 2015, he was awarded the Nobel Prize in Chemistry jointly with American chemist Paul L. Modrich and Turkish chemist Aziz Sancar for mechanistic studies of DNA repair.

Education 
Lindahl was born in Kungsholmen, Stockholm, Sweden to Folke Robert Lindahl and Ethel Hulda Hultberg. He received a PhD degree in 1967, and an MD degree qualification in 1970, from the Karolinska Institutet in Stockholm.

Career and research
After obtaining his research doctorate, Lindahl did postdoctoral research at Princeton University and Rockefeller University.
He was professor of medical chemistry at the University of Gothenburg 1978–82. After moving to the United Kingdom he joined the Imperial Cancer Research Fund (now Cancer Research UK) as a researcher in 1981.  From 1986 to 2005 he was the first Director of Cancer Research UK's Clare Hall Laboratories in Hertfordshire, since 2015 part of the Francis Crick Institute.  He continued to research there until 2009. He has contributed to many papers on DNA repair and the genetics of cancer.

Awards and honours 
Lindahl was elected an EMBO Member in 1974 and Fellow of the Royal Society (FRS) in 1988, his certificate of election reads: 
Lindahl received the Royal Society's Royal Medal in 2007 "making fundamental contributions to our understanding of DNA repair. His achievements stand out for their great originality, breadth and lasting influence." He is a member of the Norwegian Academy of Science and Letters. He was awarded the Copley Medal in 2010. He was elected a founding Fellow of the Academy of Medical Sciences (FMedSci) in 1998. In 2018, he was elected a foreign associate of the National Academy of Sciences.

He shared the Nobel Prize in Chemistry in 2015. The Swedish Academy noted that "The Nobel Prize in Chemistry 2015 was awarded jointly to Tomas Lindahl, Paul Modrich and Aziz Sancar 'for mechanistic studies of DNA repair'."

References

External links
  including the Nobel Lecture 8 December 2015 The Intrinsic Fragility of DNA

1938 births
Fellows of the Academy of Medical Sciences (United Kingdom)
Fellows of the Royal Society
Karolinska Institute alumni
Living people
Members of the Norwegian Academy of Science and Letters
Foreign associates of the National Academy of Sciences
Nobel laureates in Chemistry
Scientists from Stockholm
Swedish emigrants to the United Kingdom
Princeton University staff
Recipients of the Copley Medal
Royal Medal winners
Swedish biologists
Swedish Nobel laureates
Academics of the Francis Crick Institute
Members of the Royal Swedish Academy of Sciences